The Chinese Domain Name Consortium, created on 19 May 2000, is a collaboration among the People's Republic of China, the Republic of China (Taiwan), Hong Kong and Macau to come up with a standard way to create a domain name system for Chinese characters.

See also 
 Internationalized domain names
 Punycode

External links
 Official web site
 Information on Registering a Chinese Domain
 Website provide Chinese Domain translation and registration

Internet in Hong Kong
Internet in China
Domain Name System
Unicode